Crimson Thorn is an American Christian death metal band. According to Allmusic, they are "surely one of the world's most extreme-sounding Christian metal bands". Crimson Thorn has performed at Cornerstone Festival and Sonshine Festival. They have also been featured in HM Magazine.

History
The band was founded in 1991 by members Luke Renno, Dave Quast, Dylan Paul Jenniges, Paul Jongeward and Miles Sunde. They were almost ready to record their first demo when Dylan left, and Luke took his place on the bass. Their demo was entitled Plagued, and was recorded in 1992 at Blue Moon Studios in Minneapolis.

After Quast left, Kevin Sundberg joined as the new drummer, and their style changed from thrash metal to death metal. Crimson Thorn was signed to Atomic Records and released their first full length CD, Unearthed, in 1994. Later, R.E.X. Records re-released Unearthed. Paul Jongeward left the band, and was replaced with Andy Kopesky before the release of Dissection in 1997 on the label Morphine Records. Little Rose Records re-released it in 1999. Purification, was later released after the band built their own studio in the basement of Kevin's home.

Crimson Thorn announced at Cornerstone Festival 2007 that they were working on a new album. They performed unreleased tracks, all of which had a much more melodic feel than their previous works. Despite this, the band assured fans that the rest of the upcoming album would be much heavier, like their previous works.

On July 6, 2019, it was announced that Crimson Thorn would be coming out of their unofficial hiatus to play a week worth of shows in March 2020, on the Hasten Revelation Tour, alongside Broken Flesh, Abated Mass of Flesh, Taking the Head of Goliath, and Cardiac Rupture. Due to health concerns, Broken Flesh dropped off the tour, being replaced by My Place Was Taken.

Discography
Studio albums
 Unearthed (1995)
 Dissection (1997)
 Purification (2002)

Demos
 Plagued (1993)

Compilations
 Unearthed for Dissection (2005)
 Crimson Thorn - Anthology of Brutality: 1992-2002 The Complete Collective Works (3-CD Set) (2017)

Compilation Appearances
 "Anorexia Spiritual" on A Tribute to Living Sacrifice (2001; originally performed by Living Sacrifice)

DVDs
 Live in Minneapolis (2005)

Members

Former
Dylan Paul Jenniges - bass (1991-1992)
Dave Quast - drums (1991-1993)
Jeff Anderson - drums (1993-1994)
Kevin Sundberg - drums, vocals (1994-2003)
Paul Jongeward - guitar (1991-1997)
Andy Kopesky - guitar, keyboards (1997-2005)
Collin Anderson - keyboards (2005-2006)
Brett Wilson - bass, vocals (2005-2007)

Former live members
Billy Frazer - drums

Timeline

References

American black metal musical groups
Blackened death metal musical groups
American Christian metal musical groups
American death metal musical groups
Heavy metal musical groups from Minnesota
Musical groups established in 1991
Unblack metal musical groups
Christian extreme metal groups
Musical quartets
1991 establishments in Minnesota